Egekent is a station on İZBAN's Northern Line. Egekent is one of the new stations constructed by İZBAN.

Railway stations in İzmir Province
Railway stations opened in 2011
2011 establishments in Turkey